is a train station located in Chikushino, Fukuoka.

Lines
Nishi-Nippon Railroad
Tenjin Ōmuta Line

Platforms

History
April 12, 1924: Opening of the station
September 22, 1942: New operator of the station is West Japan Railway
March 1, 1969: Express trains stop at this station
1974: Renovation of the station

Adjacent stations 

|-
|colspan=5 style="text-align:center;" |Nishi-Nippon Railroad

Railway stations in Fukuoka Prefecture
Railway stations in Japan opened in 1924